The Hungarian Sport Horse, is a modern Hungarian breed of sporting horse. Like the Furioso-North Star, the Gidran, and the Nonius, it was developed at the Hungarian State Stud Mezőhegyes, in Békés county in the Southern Great Plain region of south-eastern Hungary. At the end of 2012, the total number for the breed was reported to be 1091. The breeders' association is the Magyar Sportlótenyésztők Országos Egyesülete, or Association of Hungarian Sporthorse Breeders.

The Breeders' Association (MSLT) organises shows and tests to maintain and develop the traits of the breed. According to their Rules of Breeding , the stud book is open to horses accepted by the MSLT based on their characteristics if they belong to a breed recognized in the EU and/or belong to a breed which is a member organisation of the WBFSH, or if it is an arab, purebred arab or English thoroughbred horse. Also accepted are all recognized traditional warmblood breeds of Hungary, including the Kisbéri.

References 

Horse breeds
Horse breeds originating in Hungary